CYTA Ltd. (short for "Cyprus Telecommunication Authority") is a telecommunication provider in Cyprus.

The Cyprus Telecommunications Authority (Cyta), a semi-governmental organisation incorporated by law, is the leading provider of Integrated Electronic Communications in Cyprus. Originally established as Cyprus Inland Telecommunications Authority (CITA) in 1955, it was renamed Cyta in 1961 after taking control of external communications from Cable and Wireless Ltd.

It is the dominant provider of fixed line telecommunications, mobile telecommunications and Ιnternet access in Cyprus.

History
Cyta has provided mobile telephony service since 1988.

It has provided Internet access since 1995 under the Cytanet brand and it now offers broadband services DSL Access. Branded as  then, Cyta entered in 2004 the digital and interactive television market. The service has been renamed Cytavision.

In the article CEL and Startup Europe promote opportunities, which appeared in the hard copy of Cyprus Mail of 15 August 2014, CYTA is written as CyTA. The article refers to an event hosted in the CyTA hall in Nicosia.

It currently operates under the name Cytamobile-Vodafone, following a Network Partnership Agreement with Vodafone in 2004.

Operations

Nowadays, Cyta provides a broad range of services and facilities for voice and data applications in both fixed and mobile telephony. Particular emphasis is placed on the provision of value added services, such as content/multimedia via the Internet which, according to industry projections, will be the dominant business activity of the next decade.

Building on its role as a telecommunications hub in the South-Eastern Mediterranean, Cyta expanded its operations in the Greek market, offering broadband Internet and fixed telephony services in specific areas of Greece, with plans for further expansion in the future. It also operates in the British market, under the brand Cyta UK, offering "tailored network solutions" to customers based on the IP-MPLS platform. Central and Eastern Europe are markets that have also been targeted.

In recent years and following Cyprus’ accession to the European Union in 2004, Cyta faced a number of challenges with regards to the legal implications and regulations of operating within the European Bloc, the fierce competition this brings as well as the ever-changing developments in telecommunications.

Services
The company covers the whole country with digital PSTN, ISDN, DSL and FTTH services. Cyta is offering fixed telephony, Internet service (Cytanet), mobile telephony (Cytamobile-Vodafone) and Pay TV (Cytavision).

References

Telecommunications companies established in 1961
Telecommunications companies of Cyprus
Cypriot brands
Internet in Cyprus
Internet service providers
Cable television companies
1961 establishments in Cyprus
Government-owned companies of Cyprus
Companies based in Nicosia